The Dubai Gold & Commodities Exchange (DGCX) is a financial and commodity derivatives exchange located in Dubai, the United Arab Emirates. DGCX commenced trading in November 2005 as the first derivatives exchange in the Middle East and North Africa (MENA) region. The Exchange is owned by the Dubai Multi Commodities Centre (DMCC).

The Chairman of the Exchange is Ahmed Bin Sulayem and the Chief Executive Officer is Les Male.

DGCX has 267 members. It is regulated by the Securities and Commodities Authority (UAE) of the United Arab Emirates, a member of the International Organization of Securities Commissions (IOSCO). The Exchange owns a clearing house called Dubai Commodities Clearing Corporation.

Product portfolio

DGCX trades in a wide range of derivatives contracts. The DGCX Gold Futures, when launched in 2006, introduced a new pricing benchmark for gold in the UAE – the One kilo bar gold futures contract. In 2007, DGCX launched the world's first Rupee Futures contract, which has seen rapid volumes growth over the last few years driven primarily by demand from the GCC's large non-resident Indian community.

Other products include the world's first steel rebar futures contract (2007); the MENA region's first Copper Futures contract (2012), and the region's first WTI and Brent Oil futures contracts. DGCX's portfolio of currency futures contracts also includes Australian Dollar/US Dollar, Canadian Dollar/US Dollar, Swiss Franc/US Dollar, Euro, British pound, Japanese Yen and Indian Rupee futures.

DGCX launched an Options Contract for the Indian Rupee in 2011. The contract is today the only exchange-traded Indian Rupee Options product offered outside India.

Clearing House
The Exchange provides clearing service through the Dubai Commodities Clearing Corporation (DCCC), a 100% owned subsidiary of DGCX.

Membership
Over 80% of DGCX's current membership base of 267 is from the Middle East and the Indian subcontinent.  The remainder is from the US and Europe. DGCX members are from financial centres such as London, Chicago, Auckland, Mumbai and Karachi.

Electronic Trading Platform

DGCX announced a partnership with Cinnober, in June 2012, to develop a new trading platform, which DGCX hopes will further drive efficiency and liquidity in the DGCX marketplace.

Awards
 "Best Global Commodities Exchange 2012" award from Banking & Finance Review.
 "Contract of the Year 2012" award for DGCX Indian Rupee Futures from FOW magazine.
 "Emerging Exchange of the Year 2013" award from FOW magazine.
 "Exchange of the Year" at the Global Investor MENA Awards 2018.

References

External links 
 

2005 establishments in the United Arab Emirates
Commodity exchanges in the United Arab Emirates
Futures exchanges
Companies based in Dubai
Financial regulatory authorities of the United Arab Emirates